Wang Qianyuan is a Chinese actor who graduated from the Central Academy of Drama.  He won Best Actor at the 23rd Tokyo International Film Festival for his role in the movie, The Piano in a Factory.

Filmography

Film

Television series

Accolades

References

External links 
Wang Qianyuan's personal Sina Weibo 

1972 births
Living people
Chinese male film actors
Chinese male television actors
Male actors from Shenyang
20th-century Chinese male actors
21st-century Chinese male actors
Central Academy of Drama alumni